The 2019–20 Asian Le Mans Series was the eighth season of the Automobile Club de l'Ouest's Asian Le Mans Series. It is the fourth 24 Hours of Le Mans-based series created by the ACO, following the American Le Mans Series (since merged with the Rolex Sports Car Series to form the United SportsCar Championship), the European Le Mans Series and the FIA World Endurance Championship. The four-event season began at the Shanghai International Circuit on 24 November 2019 and ended at the Chang International Circuit in Buriram on 23 February 2020.

Calendar
The calendar for the 2019–2020 season was announced on 21 February 2019.

Entry list

LMP2

LMP3

GT

Results
Bold indicates overall winner.

Teams Championships
Points are awarded according to the following structure:

LMP2 Teams Championship

LMP2 Am Teams Championship

LMP3 Teams Championship

GT Teams Championship

GT Am Teams Championship

Drivers Championships
Points are awarded according to the following structure:

LMP2 Drivers Championship

LMP2 Am Drivers Championship

LMP3 Drivers Championship

GT Drivers Championship

GT Am Drivers Championship

Notes

External links
 

Asian Le Mans Series seasons
Asian Le Mans Series
Asian Le Mans Series
Le Mans Series
Le Mans Series